The 2016 Berlin state election was held on 18 September 2016 to elect the members to the 18th Abgeordnetenhaus of Berlin. The incumbent grand coalition of the Social Democratic Party (SPD) and Christian Democratic Union (CDU) was defeated, with both parties suffering significant losses. The Left (Die Linke) became the third largest party, while the fourth-placed Greens suffered losses. Alternative for Germany (AfD) won seats for the first time. The Free Democratic Party (FDP) re-entered the Abgeordnetenhaus after falling out in the 2011 election. The Pirate Party, which had achieved state-level representation for the first time in the previous election, lost all of its seats.

After the election, the SPD formed a coalition with The Left and Greens. Mayor Michael Müller was subsequently re-elected.

Opinion polling

Party polling

Election result
< 2011    Next >
|-
| colspan=7 bgcolor=white | 
|-
!style="background-color:#E9E9E9" align=left colspan="2" rowspan="2" width=400 |Party
!style="background-color:#E9E9E9" align=center colspan="3" |Popular vote
!style="background-color:#E9E9E9" align=center colspan="3" |Seats
|-
!style="background-color:#E9E9E9" align=right width=60|Votes
!style="background-color:#E9E9E9" align=right width=40|%
!style="background-color:#E9E9E9" align=right width=50|+/–
!style="background-color:#E9E9E9" align=right width=30|Seats
!style="background-color:#E9E9E9" align=right width=30|+/–
|-
|  Sozialdemokratische Partei Deutschlands – SPD|| 352,369 || 21.6 || 6.7 || 38 || 10
|-
|  Christlich Demokratische Union Deutschlands – CDU|| 288,002 || 17.6 || 5.8 || 31 || 8
|-
|  Die Linke|| 255,740 || 15.6 || 4.0 || 27 || 7
|-
|  Bündnis 90/Die Grünen|| 248,243 || 15.2 || 2.4 || 27 || 3
|-
|  Alternative für Deutschland – AfD|| 231,325 || 14.2 || 14.2 || 25 || 25
|-
|  Freie Demokratische Partei – FDP|| 109,431 || 6.7 || 4.9 || 12 || 12
|-
|  Partei für Arbeit, Rechtstaat, Tierschutz, Elitenförderung und basisdemokratische Initiative|| 31,908 || 2.0 || 1.1 || – || –
|-
|  Tierschutzpartei|| 30,565 || 1.9 || 0.4 || – || –
|-
|  Piratenpartei Deutschland|| 28,321 || 1.7 || 7.2 || – || 15
|-
| || align=left |  Allianz Graue Panther Deutschland|| 18,135 || 1.1 || 1.1 || – || –
|-
| bgcolor="white"| || align=left |Other parties|| 40,717 || 2.4 ||  –|| – || –
|- style="background-color:#E9E9E9"
| align="right" colspan="2" | Valid votes
| 1,634,756
| 98.5%
| 0.1
| colspan=2 rowspan=2 color=#BAB9B9|
|- style="background-color:#E9E9E9"
| align="right" colspan="2" | Invalid votes
| 25,690
| 1.5%
| 0.1
|- style="background-color:#E9E9E9"
| align="right" colspan="2" | Totals and voter turnout
| 1,662,598	
| 66.9% 
| 6.7
| 160
| 8
|- style="background-color:#BAB9B9"
| colspan="2" | Electorate
| 2,485,363
| 100.00
| —
| colspan=2|
|-
| colspan=11 align=left | Source:
|}

References

External links 
 Election Schedule, Die Landeswahlleiterin für Berlin, in German

2016 elections in Germany
Elections in Berlin
2016 in Berlin
September 2016 events in Germany